András Rosztóczy (born 26 August 1967) is a Hungarian gastroenterologist, medical researcher, and assistant professor.

Life
He graduated from the Albert Szent-Györgyi Medical University, Szeged in 1992. He has been working at the First Department of Medicine, University of Szeged (until 2000 Albert Szent-Györgyi Medical University) since his graduation. Meanwhile, he was awarded a scholarship to Division of Gastroenterology, the Johns Hopkins University, School of Medicine in Baltimore, the United States in 1991 and to Unite Neurogatroenterologie et Nutrition, INRA, Toulouse, France in 2000. He is known for his work in the field of Gastroesophageal reflux disease (GERD).

He completed his PhD degree in 2008. The title of his doctoral thesis was Clinical evaluation of primary and secondary oesophageal motility disorders: new data on the pathogenesis of cardiac and respiratory manifestations of gastro-oesophageal reflux disease, the characteristics of motility disorders in patients diabetes mellitus and in primary Sjögren’s syndrome. His supervisor was Prof. Tibor Wittmann.

He is responsible for English-language medical education. His lecture of the second semester in the academic year 2012/13 is Internal Medicine Practice.  
He joined the editorial board of Frontiers in Gastrointestinal Sciences as Review Editor.

Personal life
His father, István Rosztóczy was a Hungarian microbiologist, medical researcher and blood donor organizer. His paternal grandfather, Ernő Rosztóczy, senior (1899–1969) was a physician. His mother is Zsuzsanna Czapf. He has a sibling. His younger brother, Péter Rosztóczy (born 1978) studied Mathematics and Computer Science at Eötvös Loránd University (ELTE), Budapest. András's wife is Andrea Vass, who works as a cardiologist. They have two children, a daughter named Sára (born 1996) and a son named Csaba (born 2002).

He is a devoted hiker.

Selected works

Papers
Rosztóczy, András, Kovács L, Wittmann T, Lonovics J, Pokorny G. Manometric assessment of impaired esophageal motor function in primary Sjogren's syndrome. Clin Exp Rheumatol. 2001; 19: 147–152. IF: 2.366
Rosztóczy, András, Róka R, Várkonyi TT, Lengyel C, Izbéki F, Lonovics J, Wittmann T. Regional differences in the manifestation of gastrointestinal motor disorders in diabetic patients with autonomic neuropathy. Z Gastroenterol. 2004; 42: 1295–1300. IF: 0.800
Róka R, Rosztóczy, András, Izbéki F, Taybani Z., Kiss I., Lonovics J, Wittmann T. Prevalence of respiratory symptoms and diseases associated with gastroesophageal reflux disease. Digestion. 2005; 71: 92–96. IF: 1.826
Rosztóczy, András, Vass A, Izbéki F, Nemes A, Rudas L, Csanády M, Lonovics J, Forster T, Wittmann T. The evaluation of gastro-oesophageal reflux and oesophagocardiac reflex in patients with angina-like chest pain following cardiologic investigations. Int J Cardiol. 2007; 118: 62–68. IF: 1.765
Kiss I, Rosztóczy András, Wittmann T, Papós M, Fehér A, Csernay L, Lonovics J: New radiologic method for evaluation of motility disorders in gastroesophageal reflux disease (GERD). Z. Gastroenterol. 1994; 32: 94(A).
Rosztóczy András, Fehér A, Vass A, Varga A, Forster T, Molnár I, Wittmann T, Lonovics J: The incidence of ischemic hearth disease and different esophageal motor disorders in suspected esophageal chest pain. Z Gastroenterol. 1997; 35: 399(A).
Várkonyi TT., Rosztóczy András, Wittmann T, Tornóczky J, Simon L, Lonovics J. Diabetes mellitus és gastrointestinális motilitás. Hippocrates. 2000; 2: 217–221.
Zöllei É, Paprika D, Wittmann T, Rosztóczy András, Róka R, Zingl Z, Rudas L. Oesophageal acid stimulation in humans: Does it alter baroreflex function? Acta Phys Hung. 2003; 90: 109–114.
Róka R, Wittmann T, Rosztóczy András, Rudas L, Lonovics J. The role of esophagocardiac reflex in the pathogenesis of coronary vasospasm: a case report. Z Gastroenterol. 2003; 41: 455(A).
Rosztóczy András, Vass A, Izbéki F, Kurucsai G, Róka R, Horváth T, Lonovics J, Forster T, Wittmann T. Savas gastrooesophagealis reflux által provokált coronariaspazmus kórképe. Magyar Belorv Arch. 2006; 59: 203–206.
Rosztóczy, András. Extraoesophagealis reflux betegség. A tünetek patofiziológiai háttere, a diagnózis és kezelés lehetőségei. Lege Artis Medicinae. 2007; 17: 205–211.
Annaházi A, Róka R, Izbéki F, Lonovics J, Wittmann T, Rosztóczy András. Többcsatornás nyelıcsı impedancia-méréssel igazolt krónikus köhögést okozó, döntően nem savas gastrooesophagealis reflux esete. Magyar Belorv Arch. 2007; 60: 357–361.
Rosztóczy András, Makk L, Izbéki F, Róka R, Somfay A, Wittmann T. Asthma and gastro-oesophageal reflux. Clinical evaluation of oesophago-bronchial reflex and proximal reflux. Digestion. 2008; 78:

Book
Rosztóczy, András & Tibor Wittmann: Refluxbetegség – gyomorsav okozta bántalmak (Gastroesophageal reflux disease (GERD)) = Zsolt Tulassay & László Simon (eds.): Gasztroenterológia (Gastroenterology), SpringMed, Budapest, 2005.

Doctoral thesis

References

External links
 

1967 births
Academic staff of the University of Szeged
Hungarian gastroenterologists
Living people
20th-century Hungarian physicians
21st-century Hungarian physicians